trouvermonmaster.gouv.fr is a Web portal that lists all national master's degrees in France, as well as the procedures for applying for them, the number of places available, the selection criteria and the timetable. The site is not designed to collect applications, which are sent directly to the institutions.

The search for a Master's degree is carried out using several criteria: by discipline ("mention"), by sub-discipline ("parcours"), keyword, name of the institution, its location. The results include the number of places available as well as a direct weblink to the institutions and the full description of the courses. The results can be sorted and saved using bookmarks ("favoris").

Not all graduate programmes are listed, only those accredited by the French Ministry of Higher Education and Research.

Facts 
Launched on 1 February 2017, the portal lists 4,883 Masters degrees in its first year, 4,826 in 2018, 3,571 in 2020, 3,735 in 2020.

From the outset, the possibility of transforming the trouvermonmaster.gouv.fr website into a registration website, like Parcoursup for undergraduate programmes, was raised. In 2022, the launch of the new site was cancelled at the last minute due to opposition from both academics and student associations.

Selection of applications 
Since 2016, universities have been allowed to select their master's students. The « Je suis accompagné » ("I am accompanied") service offers students who have not received a positive response to their application the possibility to receive support from the Ministry in order to obtain a place in a Master's programme. This procedure has given rise to some uncertainty and criticism. 3300 students were able to use this procedure at the start of the 2017 academic year, of whom 735 found a place.

Prices and cost of education in France 
The French education system is dual: most masters are free (or very limited fees: about 400 €/year for nationals, or 3000 €/year for foreigners), but some private schools are as expensive as their equivalent in the Anglo-Saxon world.

See also 

 Master's degree (France)
 Master's degree in Europe
 Parcoursup, academic portal for undergraduate studies in France
 French Ministry of Higher Education, Research and Innovation
 France's education system

References 

Web portals
Higher education in France
Master's degrees